Daedaleopsis is a genus of fungi in the family Polyporaceae.  The name Daedaleopsis is a reference to Daedalus, the labyrinth-maker of myth. Similarly, the maze-like pattern of pores is taxonomically described as being daedaloid. DNA was recovered and sequenced from fragments of a nearly 7000-year-old fruit body of D. tricolor found in an early Neolithic village in Rome.

Taxonomy
The genus was circumscribed by German mycologist Joseph Schröter in 1888.

Description
Daedaleopsis fungi have basidiocarps that are annual, with a cap or effused-reflexed (crust-like with the edges forming cap-like structures). Their colour is pale brown to deep red, zonate, with a mostly smooth cap surface, lamellate to tubular hymenophore, and a pale brown context. Microscopic features include a trimitic hyphal system with clamped generative hyphae, and the presence of dendrohyphidia. Daedaleopsis has hyaline, thin-walled, and slightly curved cylindrical spores that are negative in Melzer's reagent and Cotton Blue.

Habitat and distrituion
Daedaleopsis fungi cause white rot, and are widely distributed in the Northern Hemisphere.

Species
A 2008 estimate placed six species in the genus. , Index Fungorum accepts 10 species of Daedaleopsis:
Daedaleopsis conchiformis  Imazeki (1943) – Japan
Daedaleopsis confragosa  (Bolton) J.Schröt. (1888)
Daedaleopsis dickinsii (Berk. ex Cooke) Bondartsev (1963)
Daedaleopsis hainanensis Hai J.Li & S.H.He (2016) – China
Daedaleopsis nipponica  Imazeki (1943) – Japan
Daedaleopsis nitida (Durieu & Mont.) Zmitr. & Malysheva (2013)
Daedaleopsis papyraceoresupinata  (S.Ito & S.Imai) Imazeki (1943)
Daedaleopsis pergamenea  (Berk. & Broome) Ryvarden (1984)
Daedaleopsis septentrionalis  (P.Karst.) Niemelä (1982)
Daedaleopsis sinensis  (Lloyd) Y.C.Dai (1996) – China
Daedaleopsis tricolor  (Bull.) Bondartsev & Singer (1941)

References

Taxa described in 1888
Polyporaceae
Polyporales genera